Niedersachswerfen is a village and a former municipality in the district of Nordhausen, in Thuringia, Germany. Since 1 January 2012, it is part of the municipality Harztor.

References

Former municipalities in Thuringia
Villages in the Harz